Padstow is a town, civil parish and fishing port on the north coast of Cornwall, England. The population of Padstow civil parish was 3,162 in the 2001 census, reducing to 2,993 at the 2011 census. In addition an electoral ward with the same name exists but extends as far as Trevose Head. The population for this ward is 4,434

The geology of the low plateau south of Padstow has resulted in such features as Tregudda Gorge where erosion along the faultline has caused sheer cliffs 
to form; and the Marble Cliffs which have alternating black and white strata. The Round Hole is a collapsed sea cave.

History

After his death a monastery (Lanwethinoc, the church of Wethinoc, an earlier holy man) was established here which was of great importance until  (probably Padstow) was raided by the Vikings in 981, according to the Anglo-Saxon Chronicle. Whether as a result of this attack or later, the monks moved inland to Bodmin, taking with them the relics of St Petroc. The cult of St Petroc was important both in Padstow and Bodmin.

Padstow is recorded in the Domesday Book (1086) when it was held by Bodmin Monastery. There was land for 4 ploughs, 5 villeins who had 2 ploughs, 6 smallholders and 24 acres of pasture. It was valued at 10 shillings (half of a pound sterling).
 
In the medieval period, Padstow was commonly called Aldestowe ('old place' in contrast to Bodmin, the 'new place'). or Hailemouth ( being Cornish for 'estuary').

Padstow had considerable importance in the middle ages as a manor belonging to Bodmin monastery and as the site of a safe haven (one of the few on the north coast). So it became a busy fishing port and the site of nine chapels in addition to the parish church. The manor was leased to the family of Prideaux by the last prior before the dissolution in Henry VIII's reign. The town prospered through trade with Ireland and the English and Welsh ports on the Bristol Channel. Later trade was the export of tin, copper, lead, slate, cured fish and dairy produce, as well as the importing of timber from Norway and Sweden, salt and wine from France, and hemp, iron and jute from Russia. In the first half of the 19th century it was a significant port of embarcation for emigrants, particular those bound for Canada. Later on a shipbuilding industry developed with five shipyards though by 1900 this had declined. The North Cornwall Railway reached Padstow in 1899, a large hotel was built and there was a revival of the fishing industry.

The seal of the borough of Padstow was a ship with three masts, the sails furled and an anchor hanging from the bow, with the legend "Padstow".

The TV archaeology programme Time Team filmed in Padstow for the episode "From Constantinople to Cornwall," broadcast on 9 March 2008.

There are two Cornish crosses in the parish: one is built into a wall in the old vicarage garden and another is at Prideaux Place (consisting of a four-holed head and part of an ornamented cross shaft). There is also part of a decorated cross shaft in the churchyard.

During World War II, in 1940, a single aircraft dropped some bombs on the town, one of which hit and demolished a terrace of houses in New Street, killing three.

Churches

The church of St Petroc is one of four said to have been founded by the saint, the others being Little Petherick (or St Petroc Minor), Parracombe and Bodmin. It is quite large and mostly of 13th- and 14th-century date. There is a fine 15th-century font of Catacleuse stone; the pulpit of c. 1530 is also of interest. There are two fine monuments to members of the Prideaux family (Sir  
Nicholas, 1627. and Edmund, 1693): there is also a monumental brass of 1421. The benefice is a rectory: Padstow (St Petroc), St Merryn and St Issey with St Petroc Minor now form a group within the deanery of Pydar.

Economy

Traditionally a fishing port, Padstow is now a popular tourist destination. Although some of its former fishing fleet remains, it is mainly a yachting haven on a dramatic coastline with few easily navigable harbours. The influence of restaurateur Rick Stein can be seen in the port, and tourists travel from long distances to eat at his restaurant and cafés. This has led to the town being dubbed "Padstein", by food writers in the British media.

Plans to build a skatepark in Padstow were proposed and funds were raised to create this at the Recreation Ground (Wheal Jubilee Parc). Construction was completed in 2019.

Transport

Maritime traffic
Padstow had considerable importance in the Middle Ages as a manor belonging to Bodmin monastery and as the site of a safe haven (one of the few on the north coast). So it became a busy fishing port. Padstow prospered through trade with Ireland and the English and Welsh ports on the Bristol Channel, and during the early 18th Century returned over £100 in duties related to coal imports for both the periods 1708-1710 and 1710-1713, more than any other cornish port except Falmouth. Later trade was the export of tin, copper, lead, slate, cured fish and dairy produce, as well as the importing of timber from Norway and Sweden, salt and wine from France, and hemp, iron and jute from Russia.

In the first half of the 19th century Padstow was a significant port of embarcation for emigrants, particularly those bound for Canada, and during the mid-19th century ships carrying timber from Canada such as the barques Clio, Belle and Voluna; and the brig Dalusia were making the journey across the Atlantic. Quebec City was a specific destination recorded and while such vessels brought timber, the offer of cheap travel to passengers wishing to emigrate enticed some to make the journey to Canada. Local shipbuilders also benefited from the quality of incoming cargoes, although shipbuilding had been practiced in Padstow for centuries and the town provided ships for the siege of Calais in 1346. The practice continued, aided by the imported materials, and there five shipyards recorded in the late 19th century though by 1900 this had declined.

In 1964, the harbour commissioners regained control of the harbour from the British Transport Commission and then made some improvements to it.

The approach from the sea into the River Camel is partially blocked by the Doom Bar, a bank of sand extending across the estuary which is a significant hazard to shipping and the cause of many shipwrecks.

For ships entering the estuary, the immediate loss of wind due to the cliffs was a particular hazard, often resulting in ships being swept onto the Doom Bar. A manual capstan was installed on the west bank of the river (its remains can still be seen) and rockets were fired to carry a line to ships so that they could be winched to safety.

There have been ferries across the Camel estuary for centuries and the current service, the Black Tor Ferry, carries pedestrians between Padstow and Rock daily throughout the year.

Railway
From 1899 until 1967, Padstow railway station was the westernmost point of the former Southern Railway. The railway station was the terminus of an extension from Wadebridge of the former Bodmin and Wadebridge Railway and North Cornwall Railway. These lines were part of the London & South Western Railway (LSWR), then incorporated into the Southern Railway in 1923 and British Railways in 1948, but were proposed for closure as part of the Beeching cuts of the 1960s.

The LSWR (and Southern Railway) promoted Padstow as a holiday resort; these companies were rivals to the Great Western Railway (which was the larger railway in the West of England). Until 1964, Padstow was served by the Atlantic Coast Express, a direct train service to/from London Waterloo, but the station was closed in 1967. The old railway line is now the Camel Trail, a footpath and cycle path which is popular owing to its picturesque route beside the River Camel. One of the railway mileposts is now embedded outside the Shipwright's Arms public house on the Harbour Front.

Go Cornwall Bus operates buses to the station.

Buses

Padstow is served by bus services 56 from Newquay and 11/11A from Plymouth which also serves Bodmin Parkway as noted above.  Both are operated by Go Cornwall Bus and run hourly Monday to Saturday, less frequent on Sundays and Bank Holidays. There is also the Atlantic Coaster from Newquay, run with open top buses and provided by First Kernow.

Footpaths
The South West Coast Path runs on both sides of the River Camel estuary and crosses from Padstow to Rock via the Black Tor ferry. The path gives walking access to the coast with Stepper Point and Trevose Head within an easy day's walk of Padstow.

The Saints' Way long-distance footpath runs from Padstow to Fowey on the south coast of Cornwall.

The Camel Trail cycleway follows the course of the former railway (see above) from Padstow. It is open to walkers, cyclists and horse riders and suitable for disabled access.

Culture

'Obby 'Oss festival

Padstow is best known for its "'Obby 'Oss" festival. Although its origins are unclear, it most likely stems from an ancient fertility rite, perhaps the Celtic festival of Beltane. The festival starts at midnight on May Eve when townspeople gather outside the Golden Lion Inn to sing the "Night Song." By morning, the town has been dressed with greenery and flowers placed around the maypole. The excitement begins with the appearance of one of the 'Obby 'Osses. Male dancers cavort through the town dressed as one of two 'Obby 'Osses, the "Old" and the "Blue Ribbon" 'Obby 'Osses; as the name suggests, they are stylised kinds of horses. Prodded on by acolytes known as "Teasers," each wears a mask and black frame-hung cape under which they try to catch young maidens as they pass through the town. Throughout the day, the two parades, led by the "Mayer" in his top hat and decorated stick, followed by a band of accordions and drums, then the 'Oss and the Teaser, with a host of people – all singing the "Morning Song."RANKIN FAMILY - PADSTOW (THE MAY MORNING SONG) LYRICS – pass along the streets of the town. Finally, late in the evening, the two 'osses meet, at the maypole, before returning to their respective stables where the crowd sings of the 'Obby 'Oss death, until its resurrection the following May Eve.

Mummers' or Darkie Day

On Boxing Day and New Year's Day, it is a tradition for some residents to don blackface and parade through the town singing 'minstrel' songs. This is an ancient midwinter celebration that occurs every year in Padstow and was originally part of the pagan heritage of midwinter celebrations that were regularly celebrated all over Cornwall where people would guise dance and disguise themselves by blackening up their faces or wearing masks. Recently (since 2007), the people of Penzance have revived its midwinter celebration with the Montol Festival which like Padstow at times would have had people darkening or painting their skin to disguise themselves as well as masking.)

Folklorists associate the practice with the widespread British custom of blacking up for mumming and morris dancing, and suggest there is no record of slave ships coming to Padstow. Once an unknown local charity event, the day has recently become controversial, perhaps since a description was published. 
Also some now suggest it is racist for white people to "black up" for any reason.  
Although "outsiders" have linked the day with racism, Padstonians insist that this is not the case and are incredulous at both description and allegations. Long before the controversy Charlie Bate, noted Padstow folk advocate, recounted that in the 1970s the content and conduct of the day were carefully reviewed to avoid potential offence. 
The Devon and Cornwall Constabulary have taken video evidence twice and concluded there were no grounds for prosecution. 
Nonetheless protests resurface annually. The day has now been renamed Mummers' Day in an attempt to avoid offence and identify it more clearly with established Cornish tradition. 
The debate has now been subject to academic scrutiny.

Other similar traditions that use the black-face disguise and are still celebrated within the United Kingdom are the Border Morris dancers, and Molly dancers of the East Midlands and East Anglia.

Notable people
Paul Ainsworth, Michelin starred chef, runs four businesses in Padstow.
 Dr. Humphrey Prideaux, Dean of Norwich, was born in 1648 in Padstow
Donald Rawe, Cornish publisher, dramatist, novelist, and poet, was born in Padstow. He became a member of Gorseth Kernow in 1970, under the Bardic name of Scryfer Lanwednoc ('Writer of Padstow').
Rick Stein, restaurateur and celebrity chef, owns several restaurants and businesses in the town.
Enys Tregarthen, author and folklorist

See also

 Padstow Coastal Gun Battery
 Padstow lifeboat

References

Henderson, Charles (1938) "Padstow Church and Parish" in: Doble, G. H. Saint Petrock, a Cornish Saint; 3rd ed. [Wendron: the author]; pp. 51–59

External links

  Padstow Tourist Information Centre
 Charles Henderson – Padstow Church: Its History and List of Vicars, 1927
 Historical information on Padstow from Genuki

 
Towns in Cornwall
Civil parishes in Cornwall
Ports and harbours of Cornwall
Seaside resorts in Cornwall
Populated coastal places in Cornwall
Cornish Killas
Manors in Cornwall